Yang Ha-eun (born 25 February 1994) is a South Korean female table tennis player. She won two medals at the 2010 Summer Youth Olympics and she was a member of  South Korean women's team at the 2012 World Team Championships. In 2015, she won a gold medal in mixed doubles event with Xu Xin at the World Championships.

Career

2021 
Yang opened up 2021 playing better than her world ranking of 81 would indicate, including wins over Suh Hyowon (WR 21) and Choi Hyojoo (WR 64) at the Korean Olympic trials and Melanie Diaz (WR 68) at WTT Doha.

References

External links
 

South Korean female table tennis players
Living people
1994 births
Table tennis players at the 2010 Summer Youth Olympics
Table tennis players at the 2010 Asian Games
Table tennis players at the 2014 Asian Games
Table tennis players at the 2018 Asian Games
Asian Games medalists in table tennis
Asian Games bronze medalists for South Korea
Medalists at the 2010 Asian Games
Medalists at the 2014 Asian Games
Medalists at the 2018 Asian Games
Table tennis players at the 2016 Summer Olympics
Olympic table tennis players of South Korea
Universiade medalists in table tennis
World Table Tennis Championships medalists
Universiade bronze medalists for South Korea
Expatriate table tennis people in Japan
Medalists at the 2015 Summer Universiade